Yvonne Kauger (born August 3, 1937) is an associate justice of the Oklahoma Supreme Court, and was appointed to the Court's District 4 seat by Governor George Nigh in 1984, and served as chief justice from 1997 to 1998. She was born in New Cordell, Oklahoma, and grew up in Colony, Oklahoma, and is an honorary member of the Cheyenne and Arapaho Tribes of Oklahoma. Kauger founded the Gallery of the Plains Indian in Colony, Oklahoma and is also the co-founder of the Red Earth organization. Kauger also serves as Symposium Coordinator of the Sovereignty Symposium. Kauger was inducted into the Oklahoma Women's Hall of Fame in 2001.

Early life
Kauger was born in New Cordell, Oklahoma, and grew up in Colony, Oklahoma, where she helped her parents John and Alice Kauger with various chores on the family farm including picking cotton. Upon getting her driver's license, Kauger accepted a summer job at a small law firm. She was the valedictorian of her graduating class at Colony High School in 1955. Her time with the small law firm inspired her to pursue her law degree.

Education
Kauger attended Southwestern Oklahoma State University where she majored in biology and minored in both chemistry and English. She graduated in three years and worked as a medical technician at a medical arts lab for five years  after graduating from an internship program at Saint Anthony Hospital. Kauger used this profession to fund her dream of becoming a lawyer. Kauger received her law degree at Oklahoma City University School of Law in 1969, where she graduated first in her law school class.

Upon graduation, Kauger had received many job offers and worked in a private practice for Senator Cleeta John Rogers for two and a half years. After this, Kauger worked for Justice Ralph B. Hodges as a clerk for eleven and a half years before she was appointed to succeed Justice Hodges on the Oklahoma Supreme Court.

Oklahoma Supreme Court
Kauger was appointed to the Court by Governor George Nigh in 1984, and was one of the first two women appointed to the Court along with Alma Wilson. She served as chief justice from January 2007 to December 2008.

In 1986, Chief Justice John B. Doolin appointed Justice Kauger to establish and coordinate the Sovereignty Symposium, which has become an annual two-day event sponsored by the Oklahoma Supreme Court. The Symposium is held in the renovated Judicial Center building  in Oklahoma City. The symposium attracts national and international experts and tribal leaders to discuss topics connected to art, law and history. Such issues can be exchanged in a scholarly, non-adversarial environment.

After the Judicial Center renovation was complete, Kauger decorated it with 70 pieces of Native American art works that she found in the Oklahoma History Center archives. She then collaborated with writer Gayleen Rabakukk and photographer Neil Chapman, while she served as editor herself.

Achievements
Kauger was inducted in the Oklahoma Women's Hall of Fame in 2001.
Governor's Arts Awards
Woman of the Year by the Oklahoma City Chapter of Business and Professional Women's Club (1984)
Adopted by the Cheyenne-Arapaho tribes (1984)
Selected by High Noon as Woman of the Year (1985)
Honorary doctorate from Oklahoma City University (1991)
Herbert Harley Award by the American Judicature Society (1999)
Inducted into the Oklahoma Women's Hall of Fame (2001)
District State-Federal Judicial Council Hall of Fame
Co-founded annual Red Earth Festival.
Washita County Hall of Fame
First Coordinator of the Sovereignty Symposium (2016)

See also
List of female state supreme court justices

Notes

References
Oklahoma City Journal Record article on Kauger

External links
Oklahoma Women's Hall of Fame Oral History Collection

1937 births
Living people
Chief Justices of the Oklahoma Supreme Court
Women chief justices of state supreme courts in the United States
Women in Oklahoma politics
People from New Cordell, Oklahoma
Southwestern Oklahoma State University alumni
Oklahoma City University School of Law alumni
20th-century American judges
21st-century American judges
20th-century American women judges
21st-century American women judges